Arthur Maurice Woodward  (29 June 1883 – 12 November 1973) was a British archaeologist and ancient historian who was director of the British School at Athens from 1923 to 1929. He was later head of the department of ancient history at the University of Sheffield. During the First World War he served with the British Army in the British Salonika Force and was mentioned in despatches.

Early life
Arthur Maurice Woodward was born in Everton, Liverpool, on 29 June 1883, the son of the Reverend William Harris Woodward. His mother was Katherine Mary Woodward. He was educated at Shrewsbury School and Magdalen College, University of Oxford.

Career

In 1908, Woodward was appointed to a studentship at the British School at Athens. He was assistant director in 1909-10 and 1922–23 and director from 1923 to 1929. He was an assistant lecturer at the University of Liverpool, 1911–12, and at Leeds in 1912–22. He was later a lecturer then reader in ancient history and archaeology and subsequently head of the department of ancient history at the University of Sheffield, 1945-47.

During the First World War, Woodward served in the British Army in Macedonia and Bulgaria with the British Salonika Force (November 1915 to January 1919). He was mentioned in despatches twice. In 1924 he was awarded the Greek Order of the Redeemer (class unknown).

Among Woodward's writings were articles for The Numismatic Chronicle (he was a keen student of numismatics), numerous articles for the proceedings of the British School at Athens, articles for the Yorkshire Archaeological Society and, later, entries for The Oxford Classical Dictionary under the initials "AMW".

Marriage
In 1925, Woodward married Jocelyn Mary Pybus (died 12 November 1973) second daughter of John Pybus. Jocelyn was a student at the British School at Athens in 1922-23.

Death
Woodward died, at the age of 90, on 12 November 1973.

Selected publications
The Roman Fort at Ilkley. Yorkshire Archaeological Society, Huddersfield, 1925.
Excavations at Slack, 1913-1915. (With P.W. Dodd) (Reprinted from The Yorkshire Archaeological Journal, Vol. 26.)
The Coinage of Pertinax. The University Press, Oxford, 1957. (Reprinted from The Numismatic Chronicle, 6th series, Vol. 17, 1957.)

References

External links 
http://bsahistory.blogspot.co.uk/2009/04/directors-inter-war-years.html
http://bsahistory.blogspot.co.uk/2008/06/bsa-students-and-clerical-family.html

1883 births
1973 deaths
Directors of the British School at Athens
English numismatists
Academics of the University of Sheffield
People educated at Shrewsbury School
Alumni of Magdalen College, Oxford
English archaeologists
English classical scholars
British Army General List officers
British Army personnel of World War I
People from Everton